Frontios is the third serial of the 21st season of the British science fiction television series Doctor Who, which was first broadcast in four twice-weekly parts on BBC1 from 26 January to 3 February 1984.

Set in the far future, the serial involves the alien Gravis (John Gillett) enslaving the last surviving humans to mine the planet for use as a spaceship for the Gravis.

Plot

The TARDIS lands in the far future, on the planet Frontios, where some of the last vestiges of humanity are struggling for survival. The planet is being attacked by meteor showers orchestrated by an unknown enemy responsible for the disappearance of several prominent colonists, including the colony's leader, Captain Revere. After witnessing Revere being "eaten by the ground," Security Chief Brazen claims Revere died of natural causes. Revere's son, Plantagenet, assumes the leadership of the colony.

The Fifth Doctor, Tegan and Turlough emerge in the middle of the bombardment and decide to help the colonists. Needing better light in the medical facility, the Doctor sends Tegan and Turlough to fetch equipment from the TARDIS. However, they find that the ship's inner door is stuck, preventing them from getting beyond the console room. Norna, Tegan and Turlough obtain an acid-battery from the research room to power the lights. On their way back, however, they are forced to render the Warnsman unconscious to avoid capture. Following a second bombardment, the TARDIS is seemingly destroyed; all that is left is the Doctor's hat stand.

Plantagenet orders the execution of the Doctor, but Turlough intercedes. Plantagenet tries to attack the Doctor with a crowbar but suffers a heart attack. The Time Lord saves his life using the battery, yet Plantagenet is dragged into the ground.

The Doctor, Tegan and Turlough discover that the culprits are the Gravis and his Tractators, giant insects with incredible powers over gravity. The disappeared colonists are being used to power the Gravis' machines. Turlough briefly undergoes a nervous breakdown because the Tractators once attempted to invade his home world long ago; his mind contains a deep, horrific "race memory" of the event. Plantagenet was kidnapped to replace Captain Revere, the current driver who is now brain dead. The Gravis intends to transform Frontios into an enormous spaceship and further spread the Tractators. The Doctor, Turlough, Brazen and his guards rescue Plantagenet by knocking out the Gravis, but Brazen is killed in the process.

Tegan wanders around in the tunnels and comes across bits of the TARDIS's inner walls. She is chased by the Gravis, who has now regained consciousness, and two Tractators. She comes upon one of the TARDIS's inner doors and opens it, finding herself in the TARDIS console room, where the Doctor, Turlough and Plantagenet are congregated around the console. The Doctor ushers the Gravis in and then tricks him into reassembling the TARDIS by using his power over gravity. The Gravis pulls the TARDIS back into its normal dimension. Once fully assembled, the Gravis is effectively cut off from his fellow Tractators, which revert to a harmless state.

After depositing the now-dormant Gravis on the uninhabited planet of Kolkokron and returning to Frontios, the Doctor gives Plantagenet the hat stand as a farewell token and asks that his own involvement in the affair not be mentioned to anyone, especially the Time Lords. Once the TARDIS has left Frontios, its engines start making a worrisome noise. The Doctor appears to be helpless as the ship is being pulled towards the centre of the universe.

Production

Script editor Eric Saward contacted writer Christopher H. Bidmead in July 1982 with a view to writing a script. Its original title was The Wanderer[s]. The scripts were formally commissioned on 26 November 1982 under the title Frontious. The scripts were delivered on 16 February 1983 and accepted three weeks later subject to some rewrites. The director was Ron Jones, who had directed three earlier Fifth Doctor stories.  The designer assigned to the serial, Barrie Dobbins died before production (later revealed as suicide) and was replaced by David Buckingham. He started on production on 8 July 1983, just six weeks before recording. Soon after this, another shock came to the production when actor Peter Arne, who had been hired to play Mr Range, was murdered on 1 August 1983. This was just hours after he had attended a costume fitting for his character at the BBC. His murder was reported widely in the British media the following day, with many reports making mention of his upcoming part in Doctor Who. He was replaced by William Lucas. Other actors of note featured in Frontios included Peter Gilmore (as Brazen), who had found fame during the 1970s in the lead role of The Onedin Line. Lesley Dunlop, playing Norna, was widely experienced, despite her being just 27 and went on to appear in Doctor Who again, in 1988's The Happiness Patrol. Jeff Rawle had also found fame in the 1970s as the lead in Billy Liar and later starred in The Sarah Jane Adventures story Mona Lisa's Revenge. It was during rehearsals for this story that Colin Baker was announced as the new actor, as Peter Davison had by this time decided to leave the show.  Frontios was filmed in two three-day recording blocks in the BBC Television Centre's Studio 6 from 24 August to 9 September 1983.

Bidmead was instructed to include a monster in the script, something he was unhappy with since he felt that the Doctor Who monsters looked "cheap" and had limited dialogue. His two earlier stories, Logopolis and Castrovalva featured no monsters. The Tractators were inspired by woodlice, which had infested his flat. Dancers were hired to wear the Tractator costumes with the idea that they would coil and twist their bodies in line with the idea of woodlice, but the costumes were too restrictive for this. The dancers were hired from Pineapple Studios. One glitch in the continuity of the series occurs in this story, as companion Kamelion is missing when the TARDIS is destroyed.  The writers of The Discontinuity Guide theorise that he is disguised as the hatstand.

Soon after the story was broadcast, Saward commissioned Bidmead to write a story for Season 23 featuring the Tractators and the Master. This was ultimately abandoned as the series itself was soon put on hiatus. Frontios proved to be his last televised story for Doctor Who.

Commercial releases

In print

The story was novelised by Bidmead and published by Target Books in December 1984. Bidmead includes many gruesome images of the Tractators technology including a hovering translation device. The cliffhanger that led into Resurrection of the Daleks is removed.

An unabridged reading of the novelisation by its author was released as a 4CD audiobook in April 2015.

Home media
Frontios was released on a double VHS set with The Awakening in September 1997. It was released on DVD in May 2011. This serial was also released as part of the Doctor Who DVD Files in Issue 100 on 31 October 2012.

References

External links

 Extended Edit: Frontios in Time Space Visualiser
 Frontios at Doctor Who World

Reviews
 Frontios in Time Space Visualiser

Target novelisation

Doctor Who serials novelised by Christopher H. Bidmead
Fifth Doctor serials
1984 British television episodes